Naryn (Narin) is a rural locality (a settlement) in Khorinsky District, Republic of Buryatia, Russia. The population was 171 as of 2010. There are 2 streets.

Geography 
Naryn is located 44 km west of Khorinsk (the district's administrative centre) by road. Tarbagatay is the nearest rural locality.

References 

Rural localities in Khorinsky District